Z33 may refer to:

Vehicles
 Nissan 350Z, model number Z33, a car
 German destroyer Z33, a ship in World War II
 Z33 Free Time, a concept car version of the Alfa Romeo 33

Places
 Art Museum Z33, Belgium
 Aleknagik Seaplane Base (FAA id: Z33), Aleknagik, Dillingham, Alaska, USA; part of the Aleknagik Airport
 Klamath Air Force Station (Air Defense Command id: P-33; NORAD id: Z-33), Klamath, California, USA

See also

 Z3 (disambiguation)
 Z333 (disambiguation)
 Zee (disambiguation)